The 2018–19 season was Futebol Clube do Porto's 109th competitive season and 85th consecutive season in the top flight of Portuguese football. It began on 4 August 2018 and concluded on 25 May 2019.

Porto started the season with a 3–1 victory in the Supertaça Cândido de Oliveira against the 2017–18 Taça de Portugal holders, Desportivo das Aves, which secured the club's 21st Supertaça win and first since 2013. Porto led the 2018–19 Primeira Liga for more than half of the season, but lost it to Benfica on 2 March 2019, after a 1–2 home defeat. Porto finished the league as runners-up with 85 points, two points behind Benfica.
Porto reached the finals of the 2018–19 Taça da Liga and the 2018–19 Taça de Portugal, but were defeated on both occasions by Sporting CP after a penalty shootout, for the second consecutive season.

In UEFA competitions, Porto participated for the 8th consecutive and 23rd overall time in the UEFA Champions League group stage, a record shared with Barcelona and Real Madrid. They advanced to the round of 16 as group winners, where they beat Italian side Roma to qualify for the quarter-finals for the first time since 2015. For the second consecutive season, they were eliminated from the competition after losing to English side Liverpool.

Players

Squad information

Transfers and loans

In

Total expending:   €27.2 million

Out

Total income:  €65 million

Loan in

Loan return

Loan out

Technical staff

{| class=wikitable
|-
!Position
!Staff
|-
| Head coach ||  Sérgio Conceição
|-
|rowspan=2| Assistant coaches ||  Siramana Dembélé
|-
| Vítor Bruno
|-
|rowspan=3| Fitness coaches ||  Manuel Vítor
|-
| Telmo Sousa
|-
| Eduardo Oliveira
|-
| Goalkeeping coach ||  Diamantino Figueiredo
|-

Pre-season and friendlies

Competitions

Overall record

Supertaça Cândido de Oliveira

Primeira Liga

League table

Results by round

Matches

Taça de Portugal

Third round

Fourth round

Fifth round

Quarter-finals

Semi-finals

Final

Taça da Liga

Third round

Semi-finals

Final

UEFA Champions League

Group stage

Knockout phase

Round of 16

Quarter-finals

Statistics

Appearances and discipline
Numbers in parentheses denote appearances as substitute.

Goalscorers

Clean sheets

References

FC Porto seasons
Porto
Porto